Violaine Prince (born 1958) is a French-Lebanese composer.

Works
 Arabesques. Cycle du jour. Violin Sonatas
 De Profundis.
 Requiem

References

1958 births
Living people
French composers
Lebanese composers